Villahermosa del Campo is a municipality located at the feet of the Sierra de Cucalón, in the province of Teruel, Aragon, Spain. According to the 2004 census (INE), the municipality has a population of 97 inhabitants.

There are ruins of ancient Iberian settlements located within Villahermosa's municipal term. These are known as Castillo de Nogueras and Castillo de Santa Catalina.

It is located at the western end of the Sierra de Cucalón area.

See also
Jiloca Comarca
List of municipalities in Zaragoza

References

External links 

CAI Aragon - Villahermosa

Municipalities in the Province of Teruel